Mianchi County is a county under the jurisdiction of the prefecture-level city of Sanmenxia, in the northwest of Henan province, bordering Shanxi province to the north and northwest. Its population in 2019 was 353,200.

History

 
Mianchi is known for the ancient Yangshao Culture, the remains of which were first found by Swedish geologist Johan Gunnar Andersson. In 1921, he discovered some pieces of pottery in the north of Mianchi County, near the town of Yangshao.

In 2006, the government of Mianchi County experimented with direct democracy, allowing citizens could voice their thoughts about proposed projects through petitions.

Administrative divisions
As of 2020, Mianchi  is divided in 6 towns and 6 townships.
Towns

Townships

Climate

Economy

Mianchi is wealthy in resources, having coal resources are up to 1.19 billion tons. It has 11.5 million tons of Bauxite resources, with the highest aluminium content in Asia. The reserves of quartz sand are 77.8 million tons.

Industry
Mianchi has aluminium and coal industries, as well as float glass factories and silicon refineries. Other industries are breweries, electronics, building materials, smelting, chemicals, medicine and food. The industry is turning from resources-oriented to processing,  manufacturing and high-tech. Mianchi has become an important base of energy, metallurgy, building materials and sustainable materials. It is one of the most industrially developed counties in Henan province.
 
The industrial district of Mianchi county is an important industry area of Henan. Located on the west of Zhengzhou-Luoyang industry corridor, Mianchi has a favourable location.

Tourism and culture

Mianchi has colorful and diverse scenery, such as the Yangshao Grand Canyon. Other tourist sights are the Danxia Scenic Area and Shifenggu Scenic Area. It is a popular regional holiday destination. In addition, Mianchi is home to many kinds of local products. The mild weather makes it feasible for many kinds of crops to grow well here. The total farmland area is 645 million square meters. The main crops include wheat, corn, chilies, tobacco and peanuts, of which chili is about 23 million square meters, tobacco production 40 million square meters, and traditional Chinese medicine production 36 million square meters. Mianchi is known in China for its three Yangshao treasures: Yangshao apricot, Yangshao dried persimmon and Yangshao millet.

Transportation
G30 Lianyungang–Khorgas Expressway
Mianchi South Railway Station

References

County-level divisions of Henan
 
Sanmenxia